Saptahik Bartaman  is a Bengali language weekly magazine published by Bartaman Pvt. Ltd. (the publisher of the newspaper Bartaman) from Kolkata, India. It had a circulation of 1,48,378, in January–June, 2011.

References

Literary magazines published in India
Mass media in Kolkata
Weekly magazines published in India
Bengali-language magazines
Magazines with year of establishment missing